Rans Designs, previously called Rans Inc. (styled all in capitals as RANS), is an American aircraft and bicycle manufacturer based in Hays, Kansas, United States. The company name is a portmanteau of the first and last names of the company founder, Randy Schlitter. Rans has produced over 3000 aircraft in kit form and as completed aircraft.

History
Rans was founded in 1974 as a pedal-powered sail trike and unpowered land yacht manufacturer. Early pedal-powered sail trikes were the Delta SX, Eagle 4, Windhawk and the Monorai. The company was successful in the marketplace, producing over 1500 sail trikes, and also in racing. Even two place tandem pedal-powered sail trikes were produced, like the Rans Gemini. Rans sail trikes were used by such people as avid sailor Bob Hope.

After trying hang gliding and considering designing an ultralight sailplane, Schlitter turned his attention to designing an ultralight aircraft. Dissatisfied with the early ultralights available, he commenced construction of his S-4 Coyote prototype in November 1982. Schlitter founded a new company Aero-Max, with investment from a friend to produce the S-4. The S-4 first flew in March 1983, but the company broke up over financial issues and the design fell to Rans to produce.

Schlitter kept designing new aircraft and by 2006 had a stable of 12 designs in production. On 1 June 2006 Schlitter ended production of many of the designs to concentrate on the new light-sport aircraft market. In 2010 the line consisted of six basic aircraft designs.

Aircraft

Cycles

Rans is also known as a manufacturer of upright and recumbent bicycles. In 2011 the bike line included 16 crank forward upright bike models, 14 recumbents, three tandems and one delta tricycle.

Pedal forward
Fusion
Fusion ST
Cruz
Dynamik
Citi
Street
Sequoia
Hammertruck
Zenetik
Alterra Road
Alterra Ti Road
Alterra
Alterra Ti
Alterra 29
Alterra 700x
Mini

Recumbents
V-Rex LE
Ti-Rex
Enduro 26
Enduro Sport
F5
F5 Pro
Formula LE
Stratus LE
Stratus XP
Stratus XP TI
Stratus XP ALl
Xstream
Xstream 26
Xstream Team

Tandems
Dynamic Duo
Screamer
Seavo

Trikes
Trizard

References

External links
RANS Official website
RANS Bikes

Aircraft manufacturers of the United States
Cycle manufacturers of the United States